Goran Dimovski (born 14 October 1982) is a Macedonian former footballer.

External links
 

1982 births
Sportspeople from Veles, North Macedonia
Living people
Association football defenders
Macedonian footballers
FK Rabotnički players
FK Makedonija Gjorče Petrov players
FC Akhmat Grozny players
FC Dacia Chișinău players
FK Bregalnica Štip players
FK Borec players
Macedonian First Football League players
Russian Premier League players
Moldovan Super Liga players
Macedonian expatriate footballers
Expatriate footballers in Russia
Macedonian expatriate sportspeople in Russia
Expatriate footballers in Moldova
Macedonian expatriate sportspeople in Moldova